Southdown is an industrial suburb of Auckland, New Zealand. The main company in the suburb was the former Southdown Freezing Works, part of a large industrial zone located near the North Island Main Trunk railway line. The buildings were decommissioned during the 1980s and 1990s, releasing large areas of land to be redeveloped as office parks.

For many years the abattoirs located here were discharging large amounts of untreated waste into the Manukau Harbour. This had a detrimental effect on the ecology of the harbour, which at the turn of the 20th century had been a popular and attractive place to swim, sail, fish and gather shell fish. For most of the middle of the 20th century it was a health hazard and its shell-fish a probable source of food poisoning. Since the freezing works were fully closed in 1981, the water quality has improved greatly.

The Waikaraka Cycleway ends at the bottom of Hugo Johnston Drive, next to the defunct Southdown Power Station.

Hugo Johnston Drive is the site of a historic 2.5ha asbestos cement dump used by James Hardie Industries from 1938 to 1983. The nearby Southdown Reserve (opposite the defunct Southdown Power Station) has been closed to the public since March 1999, after workers discovered asbestos material there.

References

External links 
 Photographs of Southdown held in Auckland Libraries' heritage collections. 

Suburbs of Auckland
Populated places around the Manukau Harbour